Robert Wright (1828 – October 22, 1885) was an Irish-born American soldier who fought in the Union Army during the American Civil War. He was awarded the Medal of Honor for gallantry at Chapel House Farm in 1864. He fought in the 14th U.S Infantry during the war. He died on 22 October 1885 and is buried at Cedar Lawn Cemetery in Paterson, New Jersey.

Medal of Honor citation 
For gallantry in action on 1 October 1864, while serving with Company G, 14th U.S. Infantry, in action at Chapel House Farm, Virginia.

Date Issued: 25 November, 1869

References 

1828 births
1885 deaths
American Civil War recipients of the Medal of Honor
United States Army Medal of Honor recipients